The Rainy River District School Board (known as English-language Public District School Board No. 5B prior to 1999) is a school board in the Canadian province of Ontario. The school board is the school district administrator for English language public schools in the Rainy River District, Ontario with approximately 3,300 students as of 2013. It operates schools in an administrative region of 10,886 km².

High schools

Fort Frances High School

Located in Fort Frances, Ontario, Fort Frances High School offers grades 7 through 12. It is the only high school in Fort Frances.

Fort Frances High School began offering grades 7 and 8 starting in the 2016-17 school year. Grade 7/8 students from the neighbouring J.W. Walker Elementary will be transferred to Fort Frances High School and that school will only offer up to grade 6.

School Information:
Team Name: Fort Frances Muskies
School Colours:   
Motto: Learning for All
Address: 440 McIrvine Rd, Fort Frances, Ontario, Canada P9A 3T8
Website: 

2016-2017 Administration:
Principal: Jenn Leishman

Atikokan High School

Atikokan High School is located in the small town for Atikokan, Ontario. It offers grade 7 through 12 and is the only high school in Atikokan.

School Information:
Team Name: Atikokan Voyageurs
School Colours:  
Motto: Excellence through the Courage to Care
Address: 324 Mercury Ave, Atikokan, Ontario, Canada P0T 1C0
Website: 

2014-2015 Administration:
Principal: Beth Fairfield

Rainy River High School

Rainy River High School is the only high school in the town of Rainy River, Ontario and offers grade 9 through 12.

School Information:
Team Name: Rainy River Owls
School Colours:  
Motto: Together, we empower all students to believe in themselves, to achieve, and to dream (School board mission statement)
Address: 1 Mill Ave, Rainy River, Ontario, Canada P0W 1L0
Website: 

2014-2015 Administration:
Principal: Mr. Chorney

Elementary schools

Robert Moore Public School

Robert Moore Public School is located in Fort Frances, Ontario.  It offers Grades JK through 8.

School Information:
Team Name: Robert Moore Mustangs
School Colours:  
Motto: Stampeding to Success
Address: 528 Second St E, Fort Frances, Ontario, Canada P9A 1N4
Website: 

2016-2017 Administration:
Principal: Donna Kowalski

J.W. Walker Public School

J.W. Walker Public School is located in the Fort Frances, Ontario.  It offers Grades JK through 6.

Starting in the 2016-2017 school year, JW Walker School stopped offering grades 7 and 8. Grade 7/8 students from J.W. Walker will be transferred to the neighbouring Fort Frances High School.

School Information: 
Team Name: Walker Wildcats
School Colours:  
Motto: Making a Difference Together
Address: 475 Keating Ave, Fort Frances, Ontario, Canada P9A 3K8
Website: 

2014-2015 Administration:
Principal: Kevin Knutsen

North Star Community School

North Star Community School is located in Atikokan, Ontario, approximately 140 km East of Fort Frances.  It serves the Eastern part of the Rainy River District and offers Grades JK through 6.

School Information: 
Team Name:
School Colours:  
Motto: We Shine Bright!
Address: 209 Hawthorne Road, Atikokan, Ontario, Canada P0T 1C0
Website: 

2014-2015 Administration:
Principal: Jody Labossiere

Crossroads Elementary School

Crossroads Elementary School is located in Devlin, Ontario, approximately 20 km West of Fort Frances.  It offers Grades JK through 8.

School Information: 
Team Name: Crossroad Tornadoes
School Colours:  
Motto: Home of the Tornadoes
Address: RR#1 Highway 613 North, Devlin, Ontario, Canada P0W 1C0
Website: 

2014-2015 Administration:
Principal: Leslie Barr Kellar

Donald Young School

Donald Young School is located in Emo, Ontario, approximately 30 km West of Fort Frances.  It offers Grades JK through 8.

School Information: 
Team Name: Donald Young All Stars
School Colours:  
Motto: Home of the All Stars!
Address: 57 Colonization Rd, Emo, Ontario, Canada, PO Box 57
Website: 

2014-2015 Administration:
Principal: Kendall Olsen

Nestor Falls Elementary School

Nestor Falls Elementary School is located in Nestor Falls, Ontario, approximately 110 km West and North of Fort Frances on Highway 71.  It offers Grades JK through 8.

School Information: 
Team Name: Nestor Falls Lakers
School Colours:   
Motto: Home of the Lakers!
Address: Box 219 School Rd, Nestor Falls, Ontario, Canada P0X 1K0
Website: 

2014-2015 Administration:
Principal: Kerri Tollen

Sturgeon Creek Elementary School

Sturgeon Creek Elementary School is located just north of Barwick, Ontario, approximately 40 km West of Fort Frances.  It offers Grades JK through 8.

School Information: 
Team Name: Sturgeon Creek Sturgeons
School Colours:   
Motto: Believing - Achieving - Dreaming
Address: Box 357, Emo, Ontario, Canada P0W 1E0
Website: 

2014-2015 Administration:
Principal: Kerri Tollen

Sturgeon Creek Alt. Program

Sturgeon Creek Alternative Program is no longer associated with the Rainy River District School Board.

Press Release:
Rainy River District School Board Minutes:

McCrosson-Tovell Elementary School

McCrosson-Tovell Elementary School is located in Bergland, Ontario, approximately 150 km West and North of Fort Frances, on Highway 621 towards Morson, Ontario.  It offers Grades JK through 8.

School Information: 
Team Name: McCrosson Timberwolves
School Colours:  
Motto: Home of the Timberwolves!
Address: Site 2, Box 1, Sleeman, Ontario, Canada P0W 1M0
Website: 

2014-2015 Administration:
Principal: Lucinda Meyers

Riverview Elementary School

Located in the community of Rainy River, Ontario, approximately 90 km West of Fort Frances on the border of Baudette, Minnesota.  It offers Grades JK through 8.

School Information: 
Team Name: Riverview Royals
School Colours:   
Motto: Home of the Royals!
Address: 11 Mill Ave, Rainy River, Ontario, Canada P0W 1L0
Website: 

2014-2015 Administration:
Principal: Lucinda Meyers

Former Elementary School 
 Alberton School
 Sixth Street School
 F.H. Huffman School
 Alexander Mackenzie School

Partnerships 
As of 2013, the Rainy River District School Board has partnered with the Seven Generations Education Institute, the Ministry of Education, and local First Nations’ communities in development of new technologies and programs for revitalization of the Ojibwe language.

See also
The Northwest Catholic District School Board
List of school districts in Ontario
List of high schools in Ontario

References

External links
Rainy River District School Board

School districts in Ontario
Education in Rainy River District